Karl Arnold Woldemar Majewski ( – 10 October 1942) was a legendary Finnish cavalry officer of Polish origin.

He was a colourful person and the subject of many jokes.

Family and early life
Majewski was born in Tallinn. His family can be traced back to his grandfather Wladislaus Majewski (1828 - 1873) who originated from the Warsaw Governorate, had a long military career in the army of the Russian Empire and then settled in Finland through marriage.

Arnold Majewski's father Alexander Majewski, who originated from an old Polish family of soldiers, served in Imperial Russian Army and finally settled to live in Helsinki. Arnold Majewski's mother was the Finnish Irene Hellman.

Majewski studied in 1912 in Turku. After matriculation, Majewski had had enough of school and travelled to Siberia in search for gold, and then travelled across the Far East and North America until finally settling in St. Petersburg in Russia.

Finnish Civil War
When the Finnish Civil War started, Majewski moved back to Finland. He fought in the civil war as a volunteer in the White Army cavalry under Georg Elfvengren of Karelian Forces. He took part in fights at Vyborg, Terijoki and Rautu.

After the war he continued his military career, completed officer training in Joensuu and became a cavalry captain. In the 1920s and 1930s, Majewski served in Häme Regiment in Lappeenranta. He became head of squadron in 1926, and completed the commander course in 1929. By that time, Majewski, nicknamed "Mäski" among his comrades, was already famous for his bohemian lifestyle and extravagant partying during his free time.

Marriage
In 1941, Majewski married pharmacist Helga Sonck-Majewski (née Sonck, born 26 December 1916 in Tallinn - died 12 March 2015 in Porvoo). The marriage did not result in children.

Majewski is said to have contemplated between Helga Sonck and another woman who worked as bank clerk. He is said to have pondered: "I have two girlfriends, of which one is a pharmacist and the other is a bank clerk at Yhdyspankki. If I choose the pharmacist, I will never run out of alcohol, but if I choose the bank clerk, I will never run out of credit." In the end, the pharmacist won.

Second World War

In the Winter War Majewski served in Ladoga Karelia and fought in the Battle of Kollaa. He was the youngest battalion commander in Finnish forces, and quickly became known as daredevil officer who was never afraid to expose himself to enemy fire.

After the Winter War Majewski was promoted to Major. There was even a proposal to award him the Mannerheim Cross First Class, which has only been awarded twice: to Marshal Carl Gustaf Emil Mannerheim himself and to General Erik Heinrichs, but nothing ever came from this proposal.

In the Continuation War, Majewski was famous for his 100 km winter raid to Mai Guba (north of Sekehe) behind the Soviet lines in January 1942.

Because of his Polish background and travels around the world in his youth, Majewski's command of the Finnish language was not perfect, which gave further colour to stories told about him. At the start of the raid to Mai Guba Majewski gave the following description of the mission to his troops, which later became famous:

Majewski was hit by shrapnel and badly wounded just before the end of the war. He was promoted after the end of the Winter War.

In the Continuation War he fought at Rukajärvi front, where he earned a reputation as one of the bravest commanders. He was promoted as Lieutenant Colonel in April 1942.

On 10 October 1942 Majewski was killed in action at Rukajärvi when he was presenting the position of his battalion to the TK companies after the Finns had resisted an attack from a Soviet battalion. As Majewski was counting the Soviet dead, he carelessly peered over the edge of the trench and was immediately shot by a Soviet sniper.

Majewski was buried in the Majewski family grave at the Turku Cemetery.

Bibliography

References

Finnish military personnel killed in World War II
People of the Finnish Civil War (White side)
Finnish soldiers
Polish soldiers
1892 births
1942 deaths
Finnish people of Polish descent
People from Tallinn
Estonian people of Finnish descent
Estonian people of Polish descent